John Joe Rice (19 June 1893 – 24 July 1970) was an Irish Sinn Féin politician who served as a Teachta Dála (TD) for the Kerry South constituency from 1957 to 1961.

Early life
He was born in Cork in 1893, but raised in the town land of Kilmurry near Kenmare, County Kerry. He was the son of George Rice, a draper's assistant, and Ellen Rice (née Ring). After national school he became a clerk with the Great Southern and Western Railway company working at stations in Kenmare, Killorglin, and Killarney.

Revolution and Civil War
Rice joined the Irish Volunteers in 1913. At the outbreak of the Irish War of Independence, he became Officer Commanding of the 5th Battalion of the Kerry No. 2 Brigade, a unit he would also command during the Irish Civil War, where they fought as part of the Anti-Treaty IRA.

TD for Kerry South
After the civil war he continued to be active in the IRA and Sinn Féin. He attended IRA executive meetings (1923) and was involved in attempts to reorganise the IRA (1924). He was a delegate to the Sinn Féin ardfheis in 1926, opposing the proposal of Éamon de Valera that abstention be a matter of policy rather than principle. He was elected as a Sinn Féin TD for the Kerry South constituency at the 1957 general election. He did not take his seat in the Dáil due to the Sinn Féin policy of abstentionism. He was one of four Sinn Féin TDs elected at the 1957 general election, the others being Ruairí Ó Brádaigh, John Joe McGirl and Eighneachán Ó hAnnluain. During his time as a TD, he campaigned against the Special Powers Act, which granted the Irish state extra abilities to deal with and punish suspected members of the IRA. He was defeated at the 1961 general election.

Expulsion from Sinn Fein
In 1966, he and fellow Kerry Republican John Joe Sheehy were expelled from Sinn Féin, as were many others, by the new Marxist-Leninist party leadership that had recently come into power. This move both foreshadowed and fuelled the split in 1969/1970 of both the IRA and Sinn Féin, which led to the creation of the Marxist-Leninist Official IRA and the more traditional but still left-wing Provisional IRA, and in parallel Sinn Féin – The Workers' Party and "Provisional" Sinn Féin. Rice gave his support to the Provisionals.

Family
His sister, Rosalie Rice, was a member of Cumann na mBan during the 1916 Easter Rising and was arrested for sending a telegram alerting the Irish Republican Brotherhood (IRB) in America to the rising. His cousins Eugene and Timothy Ring were members of the IRB and were also involved with the telegram. His grandfather, Timothy Ring, was a Fenian who fought in the uprising. Two of his cousins were members of the Royal Irish Constabulary who would both later help the republican side during the Irish revolutionary period.

He died on 1 July 1970.

References

1893 births
1970 deaths
Irish Republican Army (1919–1922) members
Irish Republican Army (1922–1969) members
Members of the 16th Dáil
Politicians from County Kerry
Sinn Féin TDs (post-1923)